This article is a list of diseases of caneberries (Rubus spp.).

Bacterial diseases

Fungal diseases

Nematodes, parasitic

Virus and viruslike agents

Phytoplasmla and spiroplasmal diseases

Miscellaneous diseases and disorders

References

Common Names of Diseases, The American Phytopathological Society

Caneberries
Small fruit diseases